Bulbophyllum cocoinum (coconut bulbophyllum) is a species of orchid.

cocoinum
Plants described in 1837